Luis Rafael Barrera (born November 15, 1995) is a Dominican professional baseball outfielder in the Los Angeles Angels organization. He has played in Major League Baseball (MLB) for the Oakland Athletics.

Career

Oakland Athletics
Barrera signed as an international free agent by the Oakland Athletics in 2012 for a $450,000 signing bonus. He opened the 2019 season back with Midland. He 2013 and 2014 with the Dominican Summer League Athletics, hitting .190/.292/.389/.681 with 4 home runs and 20 RBI in 2013 and .130/.216/.130/.346 with 3 RBI in 2014. He spent 2015 with the Arizona League Athletics, hitting .287/.344/.348/.692 with 0 home runs and 12 RBI. He split the 2016 season between the Vermont Lake Monsters and the Beloit Snappers, combining to hit .310/.361/.428/.789 with 3 home runs and 22 RBI. His 2017 season was split between Beloit and the Stockton Ports, accumulating a .263/.307/.390/.697 batting line with 7 home runs and 38 RBI. He split 2018 between Stockton and the Midland RockHounds, combining to hit .297/.361/.426/.787 with 3 home runs and 64 RBI. He played for the Mesa Solar Sox of the Arizona Fall League during the 2018 offseason.

The Athletics added him to their 40-man roster after the 2018 season. He spent the 2019 season back with Midland, hitting .321/.356/.513/.869 with 4 home runs and 24 RBI over 54 games. Barrera's season ended in late June after suffering multiple subluxation injuries during the year to his right shoulder. On September 8, the Athletics placed him on the 60-day injured list, in order to clear a roster spot.

Barrera did not play in a game in 2020 due to the cancellation of the minor league season because of the COVID-19 pandemic.

On May 18, 2021, Barrera was promoted to the major leagues for the first time. He made his MLB debut the next day as a pinch hitter for Ramón Laureano, striking out in his only at-bat. On May 27, Barrera was optioned down to Triple-A.

On April 11, 2022, Barrera was designated for assignment by the Athletics. On April 15, Barrera was sent outright to the Triple-A Las Vegas Aviators. On May 9, Barrera was re-selected to the active roster. On May 14, Barrera hit a walk-off home run off of Raisel Iglesias of the Los Angeles Angels. The 3-run shot was also Barrera’s first career home run.

On September 9, Barrera was designated for assignment by the Athletics.

Los Angeles Angels
On December 22, 2022, Barrera signed a minor league deal with the Los Angeles Angels.

References

External links

1995 births
Living people
People from Santiago Province (Dominican Republic)
Dominican Republic expatriate baseball players in the United States
Major League Baseball players from the Dominican Republic
Major League Baseball outfielders
Oakland Athletics players
Dominican Summer League Athletics players
Arizona League Athletics players
Vermont Lake Monsters players
Beloit Snappers players
Stockton Ports players
Midland RockHounds players
Las Vegas Aviators players
Mesa Solar Sox players
Tigres del Licey players